The 2019–20 William & Mary Tribe men's basketball team represented the College of William & Mary during the 2019–20 NCAA Division I men's basketball season. The Tribe, coached by 1st-year head coach Dane Fischer, played their home games at Kaplan Arena in Williamsburg, Virginia as members of the Colonial Athletic Association.

Previous season
The Tribe finished the 2018–19 season 14–17, 10–6 in CAA play to finish in fourth place. They lost in the quarterfinals of the CAA tournament to Delaware.

Offseason

Departures

Incoming transfers

2019 recruiting class

2020 recruiting class

Roster

Schedule and results 

|-
!colspan=9 style=| Non-conference regular season

|-
!colspan=9 style=| CAA regular season

|-
!colspan=9 style=| CAA Tournament
|-

Source:

References

William And Mary
William & Mary Tribe men's basketball seasons
William and Mary Tribe men's basketball
William and Mary